Raja Bajrang Bahadur Singh Bhadri (1906–1973) was an Indian independence activist and politician, who served as the second Lieutenant Governor of Indian state Himachal Pradesh from 1 January 1955 to 13 August 1963.

He was also the founder Vice-Chancellor of Pantnagar University. He adopted his nephew Raja Uday Pratap Singh as his son. He was ruler of Taluqdari estate of Bhadri in Oudh.

See also 
 List of Governors of Himachal Pradesh
 Bhadri (estate)
 Pantnagar University

References

 
Himachal
1906 births
1973 deaths